Lacina  Traoré (born 20 May 1990) is an Ivorian professional footballer who plays as a forward. He is nicknamed “The Big Tree”, due to his 2.03m frame, which puts him among the tallest professional footballers.

Club career

Early career

Growing up in Abidjan, Ivory Coast, Traoré began his career with Jean-Marc Guillou's football school ASEC Mimosas, before joining Stade d'Abidjan in 2006. He played in Abidjan until January 2008, when he joined the Romanian club CFR Cluj.

CFR Cluj
Traoré made his European debut with CFR, scoring a second goal in the first match of the 2009–10 UEFA Europa League group stage, against Copenhagen. He then scored another goal in the 3–2 home loss against Sparta Prague.

The following season for Traoré continued smoothly for him at CFR Cluj, when he was constantly in the first squad as a full-time regular. He scored his first league goal of the season and set up Cristian Bud in a match against Astra Ploiești on 13 August 2010. Traoré received his first red card of his career after a brutal foul in the second half as CFR lost 3–0 against Sportul Studențesc on 20 August 2010. On 15 November 2010, he scored his first brace of his career in a 3–0 win over Gloria Bistrița. In the 2010–11 UEFA Champions League group stage, Traoré scored one goal in the 2–1 win against Basel and one goal in the 1–1 draw against Roma (after hitting the post twice in Italy against the same team in the first match), both matches in the group phase and home.

Kuban Krasnodar

In February 2011, Traoré was transferred to Kuban Krasnodar in the Russian Premier League for a reported fee of €6 million. In the opening game of the season on 13 March 2011, Traoré made his debut, coming on as a substitute, in a 2–0 loss against Rubin Kazan. On 2 April 2011, Traoré scored his first league goal of the season, followed up by setting up a goal for Vladislav Kulik in a 3–1 win over Spartak Moscow. After the match, Traoré says he dedicated his first goal to the club's supporters. Traoré then scored his first brace in Russian Football and set up a goal for Gheorghe Bucur in a 3–2 win over Amkar Perm.

By May, Traoré was voted player of the month by the club for his recent good performance. His further good performance earned him player of month in September and November. In his first season at Kuban Krasnodar, Traoré made thirty-nine appearances and scored eighteen times in all competitions.

At the start of his football career in Russia, Traoré was compared to his compatriot striker Seydou Doumbia.

Anzhi Makhachkala

On 29 June 2012, Anzhi reported that they had signed Traoré for an undisclosed fee. Media reports estimated the transfer fee to be around €18 million. Upon joining the club, Traoré was given number 19 shirt and aimed to make the club very successful in the near future.

Traoré scored his first goal for the club against former club Kuban Krasnodar on 22 July, scoring the winner for Anzhi in the 43rd minute. In Anzhi's first European campaign in nine years, the club played its first match in the qualification round against AZ and scored in a 1–0. He would then score another in the second leg and the club would eventually advanced to the Group Stage after a 5–0 win. He scored another goal, in Anzhi's 1–0 defeat of Liverpool on 8 November in a Europa League group stage game. In his first season at Anzhi, Traoré would score seventeen goals in thirty-eight appearances in all competitions. Russian's newspaper Sport Express named Traoré as the most outstanding player at Anzhi in his first season.

In his second season at Anzhi, Traoré started his season very well when he scored in a 1–1 draw against Lokomotiv Moscow. However, the announcement was marred with restructuring at business level, which lead Anzhi chose to transfer list their whole squad, including recent signing Traoré. To add an insult to an injury, Traoré have his own concern when he suffered injuries.

Monaco
On 4 January 2014, Traoré signed a four-and-a-half-year contract with Ligue 1 side  Monaco.
The fee is said to be around $14 million. Traoré also have previous interests with the club in the last summer transfer window. Monaco was planning to sign Traoré and then loan him back to Anzhi.

Loan to Everton
After joining Monaco, West Ham United battled it out with other clubs to sign Traoré. Instead, Traoré joined Everton on loan on 24 January 2014 until the end of the 2013–14 Premier League season after his work permit was granted and given the number 28 shirt. He scored his first Everton goal on his debut on 16 February, the opener in a 3–1 FA Cup win over Swansea City. Traoré injured his hamstring in the warm-up for the game against Chelsea on 22 February 2014, and was ruled out until the final game of the season where he made his only league appearance as an injury time substitute against Hull City.

Return to Monaco
After a disastrous spell at Everton, Traoré was given a chance in the first team by new manager Leonardo Jardim after being recalled ahead of the new season. However, he received a setback when he suffered a hamstring injury that caused him to miss the first nine matches at the start of the season. Manager Jardim made comment about Traoré quoting: "He was wounded. He will return. I trust him." Following his recovery, Traoré made his Monaco debut, where he came on as a substitute for Anthony Martial in the 64th minute, in a 2–0 win over Evian on 17 October 2014. Traoré scored his first Monaco goal on 9 November, in a 1–1 draw against Saint-Étienne.

On 3 January 2016, when Monaco hosted seventh-tier Saint-Jean Beaulieu in the last 64 of the Coupe de France, Traoré scored four goals in an eventual 10–2 victory, despite being sent off at half time.

Loan to CSKA Moscow
On 13 July 2016, he returned to Russia, joining CSKA Moscow on loan for the 2016–17 season. On 29 January 2017, following CSKA's signing of another striker Aaron Olanare, Traoré was removed from CSKA's Russian Premier League roster, as he was negotiating another loan deal to Sporting Gijón.

Loan to Sporting Gijón
On 31 January 2017, he signed a loan deal with Sporting Gijón that will run until the end of the 2016–17 season. He made his debut in La Liga on 5 February 2017 against Alavés when he came on as a substitute in the 70th minute and scored on his debut, as his team lost with the score of 2–4. He started in the next game for Gijón on 12 February 2017 against CD Leganés.

Loan to Amiens
On 31 August 2017, Traoré joined Ligue 1 side Amiens SC on a season-long loan deal.

Újpest
In February 2019, he moved to Hungarian club Újpest FC.

Return to CFR Cluj
On 15 August 2019, after 8 years, he returned to Romanian First League champions CFR Cluj.

International career

2011 CAF U-23 Championship
Traoré was involved in Ivory Coast's successful 2011 CAF U-23 Championship qualification campaign. Traoré scored against Liberia U23 in a 4–0 win. He was also named in the Ivory Coast squad for the final stage of the tournament, which acted as CAF's qualification for the Summer Olympics football tournament. Ivory Coast did not fare too well in the competition, finishing third in the Group stage behind Egypt and Gabon. Traoré scored a consolation goal against Gabon in a 3–1 loss.

2013 CAF Africa Cup of Nations
Traoré was selected in the final squad for the Ivorians, playing in two games. He played for 68 minutes versus Tunisia, before he was replaced by Didier Drogba. Then, he had a 7-minute cameo versus Nigeria in the quarter final stage which ended the Ivorians' campaign following a 2–1 loss.

At the end of the 2013–14 season, Traoré was initially featured as part of the country's World Cup squad, but was then left out after the national team's manager selected the final squad.

Personal life
Traoré is a Muslim and he has 16 brothers. Two of them were also footballers: Messa, who had a spell in Romania at Politehnica Timișoara, and Lajo Ménéné, who started his European career at CFR Cluj, being brought there by Lacina.

Career statistics

Club

International
Scores and results list Ivory Coast's goal tally first.

Honours

Club
CFR Cluj
Liga I: 2009–10, 2019–20
Cupa României: 2008–09, 2009–10
Supercupa României: 2009, 2010

International
Ivory Coast
Africa Cup of Nations: 2015

References

External links

 
 
 
 
 
 

1990 births
Living people
Footballers from Abidjan
Ivorian footballers
Ivorian expatriate footballers
Ivory Coast international footballers
Association football forwards
ASEC Mimosas players
Stade d'Abidjan players
CFR Cluj players
FC Kuban Krasnodar players
FC Anzhi Makhachkala players
AS Monaco FC players
Everton F.C. players
PFC CSKA Moscow players
Sporting de Gijón players
Amiens SC players
Újpest FC players
Bandırmaspor footballers
Varzim S.C. players
Liga I players
Russian Premier League players
Premier League players
Ligue 1 players
La Liga players
Nemzeti Bajnokság I players
TFF First League players
Liga Portugal 2 players
2011 CAF U-23 Championship players
2013 Africa Cup of Nations players
2015 Africa Cup of Nations players
Africa Cup of Nations-winning players
Ivorian Muslims
Expatriate footballers in Romania
Expatriate footballers in Russia
Expatriate footballers in England
Expatriate footballers in Monaco
Expatriate footballers in Spain
Expatriate footballers in France
Expatriate footballers in Hungary
Expatriate footballers in Turkey
Expatriate footballers in Portugal
Ivorian expatriate sportspeople in Romania
Ivorian expatriate sportspeople in Russia
Ivorian expatriate sportspeople in England
Ivorian expatriate sportspeople in Monaco
Ivorian expatriate sportspeople in Spain
Ivorian expatriate sportspeople in France
Ivorian expatriate sportspeople in Hungary
Ivorian expatriate sportspeople in Turkey
Ivorian expatriate sportspeople in Portugal